Bette B. Grande is a North Dakota Republican Party politician who represented the 41st district alongside Al Carlson in the North Dakota House of Representatives from 1997 to 2014.

Grande is a member of the American Legislative Exchange Council (ALEC), serving as North Dakota state leader, also with Carlson.

Early life, education, and early career
Grande got a B.S. in education and a minor in sports medicine from the University of North Dakota. She has been the Director of Christian Education, a substitute teacher, and an office manager.

North Dakota House of Representatives

Elections
She was elected in 1996 and was re-elected in 2000, 2002, 2006, and 2010.

Committee assignments
Grande is a member of the House Appropriations committee, and serves on the Education and Environment subsection.

2012 legislative election
In October 2011, she announced she would run for the seat being vacated by U.S. Congressman Rick Berg, who ran for the U.S. Senate.

2014 legislative election
Grande ran for reelection in 2014, but lost her bid to retired banker Pamela Anderson.

Personal life
Grande lives in Fargo, North Dakota with her husband Don and her three children. She is a member of the Calvary United Methodist Church.

References

External links
Representative Bette Grande at the official North Dakota Legislative Assembly website

Republican Party members of the North Dakota House of Representatives
Living people
Women state legislators in North Dakota
People from Williston, North Dakota
University of North Dakota alumni
Candidates in the 2012 United States elections
21st-century American politicians
1961 births
Politicians from Fargo, North Dakota
21st-century American women politicians